The Dampfbahn-Verein Zürcher Oberland (DVZO) is a heritage railway association based in the Swiss canton of Zurich. The association preserves various items of rolling stock, utilising the historic lok remise or engine shed at Uster station, and also operates the preserved railway between Hinwil and Bauma stations over a section of the former Uerikon to Bauma railway (UeBB).

See also
List of heritage railways and funiculars in Switzerland

References

External links 
 
 The Dampfbahn-Verein Zürcher Oberland web site 

Heritage railways in Switzerland
Railway lines in Switzerland
Transport in the canton of Zürich